"Funkallero" is a jazz standard composed by pianist Bill Evans. First recorded by Evans with Don Elliott in 1956 (released posthumously on the 2001 album Tenderly: An Informal Session), the song was first included on his 1971 Grammy Award winning The Bill Evans Album .

The song has been covered by many notable artists including Lenny Breau with his 1977 recordings Pickin' Cotten, Mike Wofford on his 1988 album Funkallero, David Benoit on his 1989 album Waiting for Spring, Orange Then Blue  on their 1991 album Funkallero, Andy LaVerne on his 1992 album Bill Evans...Person We Knew, and Roseanna Vitro on her 2001 album Conviction: Thoughts of Bill Evans.

References

Jazz standards
1956 songs